The 10th Army Air and Missile Defense Command (10th AAMDC) is a theater level Army air and missile defense organization and directly subordinated to United States Army Europe. On order, the 10th AAMDC deploys worldwide to conduct joint and combined/coalition air missile defense ops for US European Command. The 10th AAMDC serves as the United States Army in Europe's executive agent for all theater air and missile defense ops and air missile defense force management.

Lineage and history
The command's lineage dates from the 10th Coast Artillery (Harbor Defense), Fort Adams, Rhode Island.  The flashes symbolize the speed and efficiency of the unit while "X" suggests the numerical designation of the unit. The distinctive unit insignia was originally approved for the 10th Artillery Group on 10 November 1969.  It was amended to correct the description on 1 December 1969.  It was redesignated for the 10th Air Defense Artillery Group on 5 April 1972.  It was redesignated for the 10th Air Defense Artillery Brigade on 2 June 1983.  The insignia was redesignated for the 10th Army Air and Missile Defense Command with the description updated effective 17 October 2011.

1 July 1924 - Constituted as the 10th Coast Artillery at Fort Adams, Rhode Island
10 April 1944 - Inactivated at Camp Forrest, Tennessee
31 May 1944 - Disbanded
28 June 1950 - Reconstituted in the Regular Army
20 March 1958 - Redesignated as Headquarters and Headquarters Battery, 10th Artillery Group
25 January 1959 - Inactivated in Korea
1 July 1961 - Activated at Will Kaserne in Munich, Germany
15 March 1972 - Reorganized and redesignated as Headquarters and Headquarters Battery, 10th Air Defense Artillery Group
16 July 1983 - Reorganized and redesignated as Headquarters and Headquarters Battery, 10th Air Defense Artillery Brigade
15 July 1992 - Inactivated at Ernst Ludwig Kaserne in Darmstadt, Germany
4 October 2011 - Redesignated as Headquarters and Headquarters Battery, 10th Army Air and Missile Defense Command
17 October 2011 - Activated as 10th Army Air and Missile Defense Command

When the command was activated in 2011, the lineage and numbering selected were those of the 10th Artillery Group. However, the previous designation was the 357 A&MDD. It was:
17 June 1944 - Established in the US Army as 357th Coast Artillery Transport Detachment.
10 October 2007 - Redesignated 357th Air & Missile Defense Detachment.
16 April 2008 - Activated at Rhine Ordnance Barracks in Kaiserslautern, Germany.
17 October 2011 - Activated 10th Army Air and Missile Defense Command in Germany

7 August 2019, the 10th AAMDC held change-of-command ceremony that saw Brig. Gen. Gregory J. Brady return as the commander to the 10th AAMDC, which he led for two years, starting in 2013. The rare chance in the Army to command the same unit twice – from the stature of two different ranks – reflects the growing importance of the missile defense mission in Europe.

Transitioning the 10th AAMDC to a one-star level command "supports the increase in air and missile defense forces and capabilities in U.S. Army Europe", the Army said, a growth that has seen the command double in size.

Subordinate units

 10th Army Air and Missile Defense Command, in Sembach, Germany
 Headquarters and Headquarters Battery, 10th Army Air and Missile Defense Command (10th AAMDC)
 52nd Air Defense Artillery Brigade, in Sembach, Germany
 5th Battalion, 4th Air Defense Artillery Regiment, in Sembach, Germany (with AN/TWQ-1 Avenger)
 5th Battalion, 7th Air Defense Artillery Regiment, in Baumholder, Germany (with MIM-104 Patriot)
 1st Battalion, 57th Air Defense Artillery Regiment, in Ansbach, Germany (with AN/TWQ-1 Avenger)
 11th Missile Defense Battery, operating Kürecik Radar Station in Turkey
 13th Missile Defense Battery, operating Mt. Keren Radar Station in Israel

Heraldry

Shoulder sleeve insignia: Upon a yellow vertical rectangle arched at top and bottom, 2 inches (5.08 cm) in width and 3 inches (7.62 cm) in height overall, two scarlet arrowheads at top and bottom centered vertically with points opposed at center between two blue triangular stylized wings; all within a 1/8-inch (.32 cm) yellow border. Scarlet and yellow are the colors associated with Air Defense Artillery.  The blue stylized wings suggest the sky and flight in reference to the air defense function and the arrowheads denote accuracy and aerial warfare.  The X-shape formed by the wings refer to the Roman numeral ten, the unit's numerical designation. The shoulder sleeve insignia was originally approved for the 10th Air Defense Artillery Brigade on 5 January 1984.  It was redesignated for the 10th Army Air and Missile Defense Command with the description updated effective 17 October 2011.

Insignia: A gold color metal and enamel device 1 3/16 inches (3.02 cm) in height overall consisting of a blue cloud bank supporting two gold crossed lightning flashes, surmounted by a red diamond shape with a gold border and bearing a gold swooping hawk with wings displayed between two gold stars, in base in front of the diamond's lower point a gold wall with three merlons charged at center with a blue anchor extending above and below a gold scroll inscribed "PRIMA" in red letters. The two stars symbolize the unit's participation in World War II and the Korean War.  The Philippine Presidential Unit Citation and the two Republic of Korea Presidential Unit Citations are represented by the three merlons of the wall.  The swooping gold hawk refers to the firepower of the unit.  The battlement with the anchor alludes to the unit's overseas service and its historical background.  The flashes symbolize the speed and efficiency of the unit while "X" suggests the numerical designation of the unit. The distinctive unit insignia was originally approved for the 10th Artillery Group on 10 November 1969.  It was amended to correct the description on 1 December 1969.  It was redesignated for the 10th Air Defense Artillery Group on 5 April 1972.  It was redesignated for the 10th Air Defense Artillery Brigade on 2 June 1983.  The insignia was redesignated for the 10th Army Air and Missile Defense Command with the description updated effective 17 October 2011.

List of commanders

MG Gregory J. Brady, 7 August 2019
BG Maurice O. Barnett, 12 July 2022

References

External links
10th AAMDC
Kaiserslautern Garrison

010
Military units and formations established in 2011